Harvey Smith Ladew I (died 1888), father of Joseph Harvey Ladew, Sr.
Harvey Smith Ladew II (1887–1976), topiary